Style is a manner of doing or presenting things and may refer to:

 Architectural style, the features that make a building or structure historically identifiable
 Design, the process of creating something
 Fashion, a prevailing mode of clothing styles
 House style (disambiguation), standards for writing, graphic design or illustration
 Investment style, characteristics of an investment strategy
 Royal and noble styles, forms of address
 Style (form of address)
 Style (visual arts)
 Writing style, the manner in which a writer addresses readers
 Film style
Style or styles may also refer to:

Film and television
 Style (2001 film), a Hindi film starring Sharman Joshi, Riya Sen, Sahil Khan and Shilpi Mudgal
 Style (2002 film), a Tamil drama film
 Style (2004 film), a Burmese film
 Style (2006 film), a Telugu film starring Lawrence Raghavendra and Prabhu Deva Sundaram
 Style (2016 film), a Malayalam film
 Style (TV series), a 2009 Korean television series
 Style (DVD), a DVD featuring Girls Aloud
 Style Network, a now-defunct US TV channel which was rebranded as Esquire Network in 2013
 Style with Elsa Klensch, a CNN fashion series from 1980 to 2000

Literature
 Style (book), a 1955 book on good prose by F. L. Lucas
 Style (journal), an academic journal of style, stylistics, and poetics in literature
 Style (magazine), a South African women's magazine published between the 1980s and 2006
 Style, a 1998 fashion book by Elsa Klensch
 Style: An Anti-Textbook, a 1974 monograph by Richard A. Lanham
 Style, an 1897 book by Sir Walter Raleigh
 Style: Toward Clarity and Grace, a 1990 writing guide by Joseph M. Williams

Music
 Style (Swedish band)

Albums
 Style (Cameo album) (1983)
 Style (Luna Sea album) (1996)
 Style (Namie Amuro album) (2003)
 Styles (Shapeshifter EP)
 Style, an album by Super Junior-D&E

Songs
 "Style (Get Glory in This Hand)", a 2005 single by High and Mighty Color
 "Style" (Kana Nishino song)
 "Style" (Mis-Teeq song) (2003)
 "Style" (Orbital song) (1999)
 "Style" (Taylor Swift song) (2015)
 "Style", a song by Prince from Emancipation
 "Style", a single by Rania
 "Style", a song from the film Robin and the 7 Hoods

Biology 
 Style (botany), a stalk structure in female flower parts
 Style (zoology), a digestive structure in the midgut of many bivalve molluscs

People

Surname: Style 
 Charles Style (born 1954), former Royal Navy officer
 Ghost Style, rapper and producer based in Hong Kong
 Henry Style (1826–1904), English first-class cricketer
 Style of Eye (born 1979), Swedish DJ, record producer, and songwriter
 Style Scott (1956–2014), Jamaican reggae drummer
 Thomas Style (disambiguation), several people
 William Style (1603–1679), English legal author

Surname: Styles 

 A.J. Styles, ring name of American wrestler Allen Jones (born 1977)
 Alfred William Styles (1873–1926), British-born accountant, trade unionist and politician in South Australia
 Carey Wentworth Styles (1825–1897), American lawyer, journalist and newspaper editor
 Darren Styles, English DJ and record producer
 Dorothy Geneva Styles (1922–1984), American composer, mathematician, organist, and poet
 Edwin Styles (1899–1960), British stage comedian, pantomime actor, radio and TV performer and film actor
 George Styles (British Army officer) (1928–2006), British Army officer and bomb disposal expert
 George Styles (footballer) (1904–1984), Australian rules footballer
 Gordon George Styles (born 1964), British engineer and entrepreneur
 Harry Styles (born 1994), English singer, songwriter, and actor
 Hugh Styles (born 1974), British Olympic sailor
 James Styles (1841–1913), British-born contractor, civil engineer and politician in Victoria, Australia
 John Styles (1782–1849), English Congregational minister and animal rights writer
 Karintha Styles (born 1979), American sports journalist and author
 Kaye Styles, stage name of Belgian singer, songwriter and TV personality Kwasi Gyasi
 Keni Styles (born 1981), Thai-British soldier and pornographic actor
 Margretta Styles (1930–2005), American nurse, author, educator and nursing school dean
 Peter Styles (geologist) (born c. 1950), British geologist
 Peter Styles (politician) (born 1953), Australian politician
 Ray Styles (1988–2020), Ghanaian artist
 Showell Styles (1908–2005), British writer and mountaineer
 Stephanie Styles (born 1991), American actress, singer, and dancer
 Suzy Styles, Australian psychologist
 Toy Styles, American author, screenwriter and film producer
 Walter Styles (1889–1965), British soldier, Member of Parliament for Sevenoaks
 Wes Styles, stage name of American singer-songwriter Wesley Garren
 William Styles (1874–1940), British Olympic sport shooter
 Styles P, stage name of David Styles (born 1974), American rapper

Given name 

 Styles Hutchins (1852–1950), American lawyer and legislator

Other uses
 Style (form of address), titles or honorifics, including Chinese courtesy names
 Style (sociolinguistics), variation in language use to which social meanings are attributed
 Stylistics (field of study), the interpretation of texts from a linguistic perspective
 Aeros Style, a Ukrainian paraglider
 Automotive styling
 Hairstyle, the styling of hair
 Neil Strauss or Style, author 
 Style, the part of a sundial's gnomon which casts the shadow
 Style, a traditional design feature of a typeface
 Styles Strait, Antarctica

See also

 Alternative lifestyles 
 Format (disambiguation)
 Human physical appearance#Clothing, personal effects, and intentional body modifications
 Lifestyle (disambiguation)
 Stile (disambiguation)
 Stiles (disambiguation)
 Style guide
 Stylist (disambiguation)
 Stylus, a writing instrument